Hauts de Bienne (before 2021: Morez) is a canton in the département of Jura, France. It belongs to the Arrondissement of Saint-Claude.

Since the French canton reorganisation which came into effect in March 2015, the communes of the canton of Hauts de Bienne are:
 Bellefontaine
 Bois-d'Amont
 Hauts de Bienne
 Longchaumois
 Morbier
 Prémanon
 Les Rousses

References

Cantons of Jura (department)